Edmund Leamy (1848 – 10 December 1904) was an Irish journalist, barrister, author of fairy tales, and nationalist politician.  He was a Member of Parliament (MP) in the House of Commons of the United Kingdom of Great Britain and Ireland as member of the Irish Parliamentary Party. A leading supporter of Charles Stewart Parnell, he represented various Irish seats for much of the period from 1880 until his death in 1904.

Life
Leamy was educated at the University High School, Waterford and at the Jesuits' Tullabeg College, Co. Offaly.

Called to the Irish Bar in 1885, Leamy was in 1880 elected as a Parnellite Home Ruler to one of the two seats for Waterford City.  When representation at Waterford was reduced to one seat at the 1885 election, he stood down but was elected unopposed at Cork North East in 1885 and again in 1886.  He also stood at Mid Armagh in 1885, but was not elected.  Resigning from Cork North East in 1887, he was elected unopposed to a vacancy at South Sligo in 1888.

When the Irish Parliamentary Party split in December 1890 over Parnell's leadership, Leamy was one of the minority in the Irish National League who supported Parnell.  Parnell made him editor of his newspaper United Ireland after regaining editorial control in 1891.  At the subsequent general election in 1892, Leamy unsuccessfully contested East Waterford.  He also unsuccessfully contested Galway City as a Parnellite in 1895 and as candidate for the reunited Irish Party in 1900.  However, in 1900 he was re-elected to the House of Commons as a Nationalist member for North Kildare, serving until his death in 1904.

He died at Pau in southern France where he was staying for the sake of his health.  At the request of John Redmond, Pat O'Brien went out to Pau to accompany Leamy's widow and the body for their return to Waterford for the funeral on 21 December 1904.

Leamy's fairy tales, including The Golden Spears, By the Barrow River and The Fairy Minstrel of Glenmalure, have been reprinted several times in various editions in Ireland and the USA.

The book Parnell’s Faithful Few by his widow Margaret Leamy contains a good deal of biographical material and is a significant source for the history of the Parnellite split in the Irish Parliamentary Party.

Selected writings
 Irish Fairy Tales, Dublin, Mercier Press, 1978
 Irish Fairy Stories for Children, illustrated by Frank and Gail Dowling, Dublin, Mercier Press; Chester Springs, PA (Dufour Editions, US distributor), 1983, repr. 1992

Sources
Freeman's Journal, 12 and 22 December 1904
Margaret Leamy, Parnell’s Faithful Few, New York, Macmillan, 1936
Brian M. Walker (ed.), Parliamentary Election Results in Ireland, 1801-1922, Dublin, Royal Irish Academy, 1978
Who Was Who, 1897-1916

External links 
 
 Full text of "Golden Spears, and Other Fairy Tales", Desmond Fitzgerald, Inc., 1911.
 
 
 

1848 births
1904 deaths
Irish barristers
Irish folklorists
Irish journalists
Irish non-fiction writers
Irish male non-fiction writers
Home Rule League MPs
Irish Parliamentary Party MPs
Parnellite MPs
UK MPs 1880–1885
UK MPs 1885–1886
UK MPs 1886–1892
UK MPs 1900–1906
Members of the Parliament of the United Kingdom for County Waterford constituencies (1801–1922)
Members of the Parliament of the United Kingdom for County Cork constituencies (1801–1922)
Members of the Parliament of the United Kingdom for County Sligo constituencies (1801–1922)
Members of the Parliament of the United Kingdom for County Kildare constituencies (1801–1922)
People educated at St Stanislaus College